Casselman Branch is a stream in Lincoln County in the U.S. state of Missouri. It is a tributary of Coon Creek.

Casselman Branch most likely has the name of the local Casselman family.

See also
List of rivers of Missouri

References

Rivers of Lincoln County, Missouri
Rivers of Missouri